Myrmecia flavicoma is an ant species native to Australia. This species is a member of the genus Myrmecia. It was first described in 1861 by Julius Roger. Myrmecia flavicoma is found in Queensland and some areas of New South Wales.

Description
The size of the Myrmecia flavicoma is 21-22 millimetres long. Head, thorax, node, and extra features are in a red colour and the mandibles are yellow. Some other features of the Myrmecia flavicoma are black, like the antennae's and legs.

References

Myrmeciinae
Hymenoptera of Australia
Insects described in 1861
Insects of Australia
Taxa named by Julius Roger